Paige Haley (born May 10, 1966) is an American musician and record producer.

Born and raised in Alameda, California, as Brad Armstrong. He is close friends with Jay Gordon, another member of their band Orgy. He used to paint houses for a living, and play gigs for local bands until eventually joining Orgy. He went on to achieve a "Diploma in Sound Engineering," and founded a company called Splizaz Music.

Musical projects

Past
Erotic Doll
Ringer
Orgy
Hellflower

Present
Julien-K
Dowry Death
Haley is currently involved with his side project, Drug For Joy. Whilst being the group's vocalist, he also plays the "Bello," a type of combination cello and bass guitar.

References

External links

1966 births
Living people
American male singers
Orgy (band) members
Alternative metal bass guitarists
American industrial musicians
Guitarists from California
20th-century American bass guitarists
Male bass guitarists
Industrial metal musicians